Vu, stylized as VU, was a weekly French pictorial magazine, created and directed by Lucien Vogel, which was published from 21 March 1928 to 29 May 1940; it ran for 638 issues.

History
Vu was the first large weekly to systematically feature photographs in essay form, and as such was an important precursor to, and proponent of, the magazine format of photojournalism (which came to prominence a decade after its print run in magazines such as Life and Look).

Innovation 
Although inspired in part by the German magazine Berliner Illustrirte Zeitung, VU featured a constructivist aesthetic and was innovative in its layouts, especially in its double-page spreads, in which the layout artists were assisted by rotogravure from film positives of both type and halftone images which could be easily cut and arranged on a light box, rather than using less flexible and more expensive metal halftone blocks.

Photography 
Notable contributing photographers included  Cartier-Bresson, Man Ray, Brassaï, and André Kertész, but the sole staff photographer was the now lesser-known Gaston Paris 1933-38 who made around 1,300 photos for the magazine. VU was particularly advanced in its use of the picture essay format.  Vu encouraged photographers to use the newly available smaller cameras, the medium-format Rolleiflex and 35mm Leica, with faster lenses, high-speed (100 ASA in 1931) roll-film in high-capacity magazines, and rapid operation, facilitated them in producing striking imagery.

Content 
The magazine published special issues on the Soviet Union (VU au pays des Soviets, 18 November 1931), which was illustrated by Vogel, himself a keen photographer, on Germany (L'énigme allemande, 1932), the ascent of technology (Fin d'une civilisation, 1933), China (Interrogatoire de la Chine, 1934), and Spain (VU en Espagne, 1936).

In 1931, Vogel founded a companion magazine named Lu (read), a survey of the foreign press translated into French; this merged with Vu in March 1937.

Legacy 
A major retrospective was hosted by the Maison Européenne de la Photographie (MEP) in late 2006/early 2007.

Selected contributors

See also

Isaac Kitrosser
Alexander Liberman

Bibliography

Notes

References

 

  ; ; ; .

   (2009 exhibition book);  (2009 exhibition book).

  ; ; .
 Supplemental edition:
<li> 
  ; ; .

   (hardback);  (e-book); .
  ;  (print),  (print),  (online).

Further reading
 Michel Frizot and Cédric de Veigy. Vu: The Story of a Magazine That made an Era. London: Thames & Hudson, 2009. .

External links
 French clip of the 2006 MEP retrospective.

1928 establishments in France
1940 disestablishments in France
Defunct magazines published in France
News magazines published in France
French-language magazines
Weekly magazines published in France
Magazines established in 1928
Magazines disestablished in 1940
Magazines published in Paris
Photojournalistic magazines